Gwynfor Davies (12 August 1908 – 10 March 1972) was a Welsh cricketer.  Davies was a right-handed batsman who bowled right-arm medium pace.  He was born at Sandy, Carmarthenshire.

Davies made his first-class debut for Glamorgan in the 1932 County Championship against Lancashire.  He played a further 6 first-class matches in the 1932 season, with his final first-class appearance for the county coming against Leicestershire.  In his 7 first-class matches, he scored 77 runs at a batting average of 9.62, with a top score of 44.  With the ball he took 3 wickets at a bowling average of 44.66, with best figures 2/18.

Davies died at Llanelli, Carmarthenshire on 10 March 1972.

Family
Davies' brother Emrys played 621 first-class matches for Glamorgan and holds a number of the club's records.

References

External links
Gwynfor Davies at Cricinfo
Gwynfor Davies at CricketArchive

1908 births
1972 deaths
Cricketers from Carmarthenshire
Welsh cricketers
Glamorgan cricketers